The 7th TVyNovelas Awards is an Academy of special awards to the best soap operas and TV shows. The awards ceremony took place on May 10, 1989 in Centro Libanés, Mexico D.F. The ceremony was televised in Mexico by El canal de las estrellas.

Lucero hosted the show. Amor en silencio won 6 awards, the most for the evening, including Best Telenovela. Other winners Pasión y poder and Nuevo amanecer won 3 awards, Encadenados   won 2 awards and El pecado de Oyuki and Flor y canela won one each.

Summary of awards and nominations

Winners and nominees

Telenovelas

Others

Special Awards
Best Foreign Singer: Miguel Bosé
Best Television Series Social Content: Mujer, casos de la vida real
Singer Highest International Projection: Emmanuel
Recognition of an artistic career: Guillermo Vázquez Villalobos
Recognition of an artistic career: Rafael Baledón
Lifetime Achievement as a singer: Roberto Carlos
TV-Singer Revelation and Best Launch of the Year: Alejandra Guzmán
Best Group Musician-Vocal: Timbiriche
posthumous Tribute: For Julio Castillo, by his great career as a stage director

References 

TVyNovelas Awards
TVyNovelas Awards
TVyNovelas Awards
TVyNovelas Awards ceremonies